Alckmin is a surname. Notable people with the surname include:
Geraldo Alckmin (born 1952), Brazilian politician
Maria Lúcia Ribeiro Alckmin (born 1951), wife of Geraldo Alckmin

Portuguese-language surnames
Surnames of Brazilian origin